Anomalacanthimyia is a genus of flies in the family Stratiomyidae.

Species
Anomalacanthimyia divaricata (James, 1978)
Anomalacanthimyia pedunculata (James, 1978)

References

Stratiomyidae
Brachycera genera
Diptera of Australasia